Claire Wilson may refer to:
Claire Wilson (athlete), Shetland athlete residing in Jersey
Claire Wilson (politician), Washington State Senator
Claire Wilson (University of Texas tower shooting), Texas shooting victim, wounded by Charles Whitman

See also
Clare Wilson (died 1917), English male footballer